William Paul Coates (born July 4, 1946) is an American publisher, printer and community activist. In 1978 he founded the Black Classic Press (BCP), an imprint devoted to publishing obscure and significant works by and about individuals of African descent, particularly previously out-of-print books, and he also established the printing company BCP Digital Printing in 1995. He is the father of award-winning author and journalist Ta-Nehisi Coates.

Biography 

W. Paul Coates was born in West Philadelphia, Pennsylvania, to Edna Coates and Douglas Cryor. Leaving high school early, Coates enlisted in the US Army; he found himself the target of harassment and racism, but he also happened upon Richard Wright's memoir Black Boy, enlightening reading that led Coates to discover other black writers, such as Malcolm X, Dick Gregory, and James Baldwin. In 1965 Coates was sent to serve in Vietnam, where he worked as a military policeman in a K-9 unit, until his discharge after 18 months, in 1967.

On his return to the US, he settled in Baltimore, Maryland, and began working as a volunteer in the Black Panther Party's breakfast program. Becoming defense captain of the Baltimore Black Panthers, he was "in charge of managing all all Panther activities in Maryland, including implementing free clothing and free food programs and housing assistance, before leaving the organisation in 1971."

In 1972, with other activists, he established the George Jackson Prison Movement to bring Afrocentric literature to inmates, aiming to "retrieve the souls and minds of the incarcerated". The program was run from a bookstore Coates and another former Panther set up in 1973, called The Black Book, and he subsequently turned his efforts to founding in 1978 the Black Classic Press (BCP), characterised as "a mission-driven publishing venture focused on preserving the collective story of African-American people". Originally headquartered in the basement of his home, with the company's first publications being pamphlets printed on a photocopier, BCP would survive over decades to become one of the longest-running continuous African-American book publishers, alongside Haki Madhubuti's Third World Press.

Utilizing the GI Bill that paid veterans to attend college, Coates earned a BA degree in community development from the Homestead Montebello Center of Antioch University in Baltimore, in 1979, and went on to obtain a master's degree in library science from Clark Atlanta University, in 1980, after which he worked at Howard University's Moorland-Spingarn Research Center, until 1991. He is co-editor with Elinor Des Verney Sinnette of Black Bibliophiles and Collectors: Preservers of Black History (1990, Howard University Press).

In 1995, Coates launched BCP Digital Printing to specialize in short-run printing, about which he said in 2018: "There are many publishing companies, but there's still only one Black book printing company in this country that I know of and that's Black Classic Press."

An impactful landmark for BCP came in 1997, when award-winning author Walter Mosley granted the company publication rights to his novel Gone Fishin – deliberately opting for an independent black publisher and waiving his customary six-figure advance – and the novel became one of BCP's most successful titles, with sales of more than 100,000 copies. Among other notable contemporary and historic authors on the list are John Henrik Clarke, E. Ethelbert Miller, Yosef Ben-Jochannan, Dorothy B. Porter, Amiri Baraka, Larry Neal, W. E. B. Du Bois, Edward Blyden, J. E. Casely Hayford, Bobby Seale, John G. Jackson, Carter Woodson, and J. A. Rogers, with the press specializing in obscure and significant works by and about people of African descent. As Coates says in the mission statement of BCP: "We began publishing because we wanted to extend the memory of what we believe are important books that have helped in meaningful ways to shape the Black diasporic experience and our understanding of the world."

Coates is a founding member and chair of the National Association of Black Book Publishers, and has served as adjunct instructor of African American Studies at Sojourner-Douglass College in Baltimore.

Awards
In 2018, in recognition of his excellence in contributing to the information profession Coates received the inaugural Dorothy Porter Wesley Award from the Association for the Study of African American Life and History ASALH), established "to honor and document the outstanding work of Information Professionals; Bibliophiles, Librarians, Archivists, Curators and Collectors."

In 2020, the Community of Literary Magazines and Presses (CLMP) awarded Coates its Lord Nose Award, given annually in recognition of a lifetime of work in literary publishing.

Personal life
Coates has seven biological children, as well as two children through his third marriage, in 2010. His son Ta-Nehisi writes about growing up with his father in a well-received 2008 memoir and tribute, entitled The Beautiful Struggle. In the Los Angeles Times, Lynell George summarized the book by saying: "What overshadows all is his father's presence, his omnipresence—the profile and teachings of a man who had a strong hand in the rearing of his progeny, both his intimate circle and the extended family of African Americans traversing an uncertain landscape. His guiding principle was simple: 'I'm not here to be your friend. My job is to get you through. To make you conscious of the world around you. To teach lessons that can carry over.

The 2020 book The Brother You Choose: Paul Coates and Eddie Conway Talk About Life, Politics, and The Revolution, written by Susie Day, is an exploration of the friendship forged during prison visits that Coates made to support Eddie Conway, a former associate through the Black Panther Party, who had been wrongfully convicted and was incarcerated for more than four decades, until his release on parole in 2014.

References

External links 
 Black Classic Press website
 BCP Digital Printing website

 "Tour of Black Classic Press". BookTV visits Black Classic Press and talks to its founder and director Paul Coates, February 20, 2018.
 Alex Green, "WI15: Preserving African-American Writings: PW Talks with W. Paul Coates", Publishers Weekly, January 10, 2020.
 "The Quarantine Tapes 149: Paul Coates". Conversation with Walter Mosley, January 20, 2021.

1946 births
20th-century African-American people
21st-century African-American people
African-American activists
African-American publishers (people)
American booksellers
American printers
American publishers (people)
Antioch University alumni
Clark Atlanta University alumni
Living people
Members of the Black Panther Party
People from Philadelphia
African-American librarians